On Sunday, 20 July 2014, a pro-Palestinian protest against the Israeli ground invasion of Gaza degenerated into an antisemitic riot in Sarcelles, France. An illegal demonstration gathered about 500 persons (the police and organisers having similar figures), without incident, but the riots broke out quickly after the dispersion of the demonstration, starting with 50 protesters provoking the police and eventually involving up 300 people according to the report of the riot police. Jewish-owned businesses and non-Jewish owned businesses were attacked and looted by local youths armed with metal bars and wooden clubs. Members of La Ligue de défense juive (LDJ, Jewish Defense League) were present in Sarcelles, and attempted to defend a synagogue by forming a line in front of it and holding motor-cycle helmets as weapons. Palestinian groups accused the League of provoking the attack by taunting demonstrators and throwing projectiles.

Background

Pro-palestinian demonstrations

The Operation Protective Edge created a lot of emotions in France, in particular within the French population of Arab descent. This social composition of the pro-Palestinian is both put forward by radical-left and post-colonial groups and by right-wing medias, and most of the events occurred in low-income and high-immigration neighbourhoods. However, after having given an unusually direct support to Israël, the French government took a hard stance and forbid almost every pro-Palestinian demonstration. The interdictions begun around 14 July, mostly presented as technical and due to the overlap with the festivities of the national holiday, but not everywhere. Then the justifications put forward for later interdictions quickly became the clashes between pro-Palestinian and pro-Israel activists, which begun as soon as 13 July. This led to many illegal demonstrations during this month, in a context of tensions. In particular those of Barbès and Sarcelles. Those demonstrations have often been described as anti-semitic, and many comments pointed out the presence of Islamic or ethnic ("communautaristes") orientations inside those demonstrations, although they have mostly been organised by the radical left and the far-left (in particular the NPA). Some incorrect news was broadcast and corrected afterwards, while we have oral reports of anti-semitic sentences which are hard to check (such as the rumour of a "Mort aux Juifs !", "Death to the Jews!") but a few pictures from the Dieudonné sphere can be found. In parallel, the pro-Israel counter-demonstration in Sarcelles was forbidden as well, since groups such as Jewish Defense League have already participated in several violent confrontations with pro-Palestinian demonstrators in the previous days.

Claims of rising of anti-semitism

France has the third largest community of Jews after Israel and the U.S. and anti-Semitism in France has increased significantly in recent years with one monitoring group claiming that it has increased 700% since the 1990s. Since the beginning of the 21st century, antisemitism in France has found new sources of recruitment from certain leftist groups and in the identification of a significant proportion of the Muslim immigrant population with the Palestinian cause on the one hand and with radical Islamism on the other. By early 2014 the number of French Jews immigrating to Israel had overtaken the number of American Jews and at the same time 70% of French Jews were concerned about insults or harassment and 60% about physical aggression because of their Jewishness, both figures being much higher than the European average.

A kosher grocery store was set ablaze, for which the perpetrator was convicted of arson.

Reactions

Government response
Prime Minister of France Manuel Valls condemned the attack as antisemitic. He said of the attack, "What's happened in Sarcelles is intolerable: attacking a synagogue or a kosher grocery, is quite simply anti-Semitism, racism."

Minister of the Interior Bernard Cazeneuve said that the violence prompted the ban, not that the ban prompted the violence.

Three men, aged 21 and 28, were jailed for between six and ten months for their part in the riot. A fourth man received a suspended sentence, and a minor received a fine. Three other men received suspended sentences for their part in a riot in Paris on the same day. None of the convictions in Sarcelles were for 'anti-Semitism'. Instead they were for minor public order offences. The term 'riot' was never used by police or prosecutors.

See also
 2008–09 Oslo riots

References

Sarcelles riots
2014 Israel–Gaza conflict
Sarcelles riots
21st century in Île-de-France
Antisemitism in France
Anti-Zionism in France
Crime in Île-de-France
Islam and antisemitism
July 2014 crimes in Europe
July 2014 events in France
Race riots in France
Riots and civil disorder in France